Proto-Mixe–Zoquean or Proto-Mixe–Zoque is a language that language scholars and Mesoamerican historians believe was spoken on the Isthmus of Tehuantepec during the Initial Formative Period (c. 2000–1200 BCE).

Evidence of this proto-Mixe–Zoque language is limited, and researchers have reconstructed only a small amount of its vocabulary, about 450 items.

Ethnic marker 
Olmec influence on neighboring groups and cultures, and those that followed them suggest that they shared a similar language, or had roots in a similar language, called the proto-Mixe Zoque. In later Mesoamerican languages, evidence of loan words suggests that in earlier times the Olmecs' influence involved not only the material culture, but the language as well. Many of the words borrowed by these early civilizations show a shared vocabulary of Mesoamerican cultigens, beans, squash, tomatoes, maize, and food preparation. The vocabulary reveals that Mesoamerican speakers had a sophisticated culture for their time.

Phonology 
A vowel could either be short or long, and the nucleus of a syllable could either involve a short or long vowel, or was followed by /ʔ/ or /h/.

Proto-Mixe–Zoque - Phonology

Mixe–Zoque language 
Archaeologists call this culture Mokaya, which means 'people of the corn' in the contemporary Mixe–Zoque languages. Archaeological evidence indicates that the Mixe–Zoque language was spoken across the isthmus, therefore sharing its roots in this Olmec language tradition, and a common ancestor, the proto-Mixe–Zoque.

See also 
Mixe–Zoque languages
Mixe languages
Zoque languages

References 

Mixe–Zoque languages
Mixe